The Italian BP Open was a men's professional golf tournament played from 1968 to 1972 in the Rome area of Italy. The 1972 tournament was not part of the inaugural European Tour season.

Winners

References

Golf tournaments in Italy
Recurring sporting events established in 1968
Recurring sporting events disestablished in 1972
1968 establishments in Italy
1972 disestablishments in Italy